Mavoungou is a Congolese surname that may refer to

Donatien Mavoungou (1947–2020), Gabonese doctor
Jocelyne Mavoungou (born 1986), Congolese handball player
Julienne Mavoungou Makaya (1950–2020), Republic of the Congo politician
Martin Parfait Aimé Coussoud-Mavoungou (1959–2022), Congolese politician and businessman
Maurice Mavoungou, Congolese politician

Surnames of Congolese origin
Kongo-language surnames